Jessica Chastain is an American actress and producer. She made her film debut with the 2008 independent drama Jolene, for which she won a Best Actress award at the Seattle International Film Festival. Her breakthrough came in 2011, when she starred in six films, and received critical acclaim for her performances in Take Shelter, The Tree of Life, and The Help. The supporting role of an aspiring socialite in The Help earned her nominations for the Academy Award, BAFTA Award, and Golden Globe. The following year, Chastain played the leading role of a CIA agent in Kathryn Bigelow's thriller Zero Dark Thirty, which won her the Golden Globe Award for Best Actress – Motion Picture Drama and the Critics' Choice Movie Award for Best Actress. She also received Oscar and BAFTA nominations.

The part of an unrelenting wife in the crime film A Most Violent Year (2014) gained Chastain the National Board of Review Award for Best Supporting Actress and another Golden Globe nomination. For playing an astrophysicist in Christopher Nolan's science fiction film Interstellar (2014), and a mysterious woman in Guillermo del Toro's gothic horror film Crimson Peak (2015), she received nominations for the Saturn Award for Best Supporting Actress, winning the award for the latter. Also in 2015, she received a nomination for the Saturn Award for Best Actress for her role as an astronaut in the science fiction film The Martian. Further Golden Globe nominations came for her portrayals of strong-willed titular characters in the dramas Miss Sloane (2016) and Molly's Game (2017), and an unhappily married woman in the television miniseries Scenes from a Marriage (2021). 

In 2021, Chastain starred in the biopic The Eyes of Tammy Faye as the televangelist Tammy Faye, for which she won the Academy Award, Screen Actors Guild Award, and Critics' Choice Award for Best Actress. She won another Screen Actors Guild Award for portraying the country singer Tammy Wynette in the miniseries George & Tammy (2022).

Awards and nominations

References

Notes

Sources

External links
 List of awards and nominations at the Internet Movie Database

Awards
Chastain, Jessica